Mowr, also known as Mīr-e ‘Alīābād, Mohreh-ye ‘Alīābād, and Mowr-e ‘Alīābād, is a village in Aliabad Rural District, in the Central District of Taft County, Yazd Province, Iran. At the 2006 census, its population was 201, in 71 families.

References 

Populated places in Taft County